The 2014 Clasico FVCiclismo Corre Por la VIDA was a one-day women's cycle race held in Venezuela. on 18 May 2014. The race had a UCI rating of 1.2.

Results

See also
 2014 in women's road cycling

References

Women's road bicycle races
2014 in women's road cycling
2014 in Venezuelan sport